The Mölle Masters was a women's professional golf tournament on the Swedish Golf Tour, played between 2008 and 2011. It was always held at Mölle Golf Club in Sweden.

The tournament was introduced in 2008, as part of the tour's overhaul in conjunction with the start of the SAS Masters Tour.

Winners

References

Swedish Golf Tour (women) events